The Commanding General of United States Army Forces Command (CG FORSCOM) is the head of United States Army Forces Command (FORSCOM). In this position, he or she is in charge of approximately 780,000 Active Army, U.S. Army Reserve, and Army National Guard soldiers 87 percent of the Army’s combat power.

General Andrew P. Poppas became the Commanding General in July 2022.

List of CONARC Commanding Generals
John E. Dahlquist 1955  -  1956
Willard G. Wyman  March  1956  -   September  1958
Bruce C. Clarke  August  1958  -  September  1960
Herbert B. Powell  October  1960  -  February  1963
John K. Waters  March  1963  -  April 1964
Hugh P. Harris  March  1964  -  1965
Paul L. Freeman Jr.  1965  -  June  1967
James K. Woolnough  July  1967  -  October  1970
Ralph E. Haines Jr.  November  1970  -  January  1973
Walter T. Kerwin Jr.  February  1973 
Resdesignated United States Army Forces Command 1973

List of FORSCOM Commanding Generals

See also
United States Army Forces Command

References

United States Army organization
Commanding General, Army Forces Command